Neophilaenus is a genus of spittlebugs in the family Aphrophoridae. There are about 10 described species in Neophilaenus.

Species
These 10 species belong to the genus Neophilaenus:
 Neophilaenus albipennis (Fabricius, 1798)
 Neophilaenus angustipennis (Horváth, 1909)
 Neophilaenus campestris (Fallén, 1805)
 Neophilaenus exclamationis (Thunberg, 1874)
 Neophilaenus infumatus (Haupt, 1917)
 Neophilaenus limpidus (Wagner, 1935)
 Neophilaenus lineatus (Linnaeus, 1758) (lined spittlebug)
 Neophilaenus longiceps (Puton, 1895)
 Neophilaenus minor (Kirschbaum, 1868)
 Neophilaenus modestus (Haupt, 1922)

References

Further reading

External links

 

Articles created by Qbugbot
Aphrophoridae
Auchenorrhyncha genera